Byrd "Birdie" Lynn (March 13, 1889 – February 5, 1940) was an American Major League Baseball catcher from 1916 to 1920. During that time, he played for the Chicago White Sox and was the back-up to Hall of Fame catcher Ray Schalk.

In 116 career games, Lynn had 211 at-bats, with 50 hits, for a .237 batting average. He won American League pennants with the White Sox in 1917 and 1919. Lynn had just one at-bat in each of those year's World Series and did not get a hit.

External links

1889 births
1940 deaths
Major League Baseball catchers
Chicago White Sox players
Minor league baseball managers
San Jose Bears players
Sacramento Sacts players
Sacramento Wolves players
Mission Wolves players
Salt Lake City Bees players
Memphis Chickasaws players
Reading Keystones players
Newark Bears (IL) players
Providence Grays (minor league) players
Baseball players from Illinois
People from Massac County, Illinois